PayPal Credit, formerly named Bill Me Later (BML), is a proprietary payment method offered on the websites of many well-known merchants, including those of Wal-Mart, Home Depot, USPS, eBay, B&H Photo Video, Best Buy, Overstock.com, JetBlue Airways, Liquidation Channel, Jewelry Television and Hotels.com. The site, which offers consumers a line of revolving credit through Synchrony Bank, allows purchases to be made online without using a credit card. The company was one of the first recipients of the Red Herring Global 100 Award by the publication Red Herring.

On November 7, 2008, PayPal completed its acquisition of Bill Me Later. It was formerly owned by I4 Commerce.

How it works
After customers open their accounts (including credit checks), PayPal Credit asks customers at every purchase to log into their PayPal account to complete the transaction. The approved customer can then pay the bill by mail (check), phone, or online (via bank account) at PayPal's official website. Once the PayPal Credit account is linked to PayPal, it becomes a funding option within the PayPal account and gives the option to pay off the PayPal Credit balance. Customers also get an email whenever they are declined. In cases when they are declined and they don't receive declined email/letter, they can contact PayPal Credit Customer Service to check if it was not a system issue. PayPal Credit is not a credit card but a revolving line of credit offered by Synchrony Bank. Much like a traditional credit card, the company will charge late payments if necessary.

Terms
For purchases of $99 and over that are made through PayPal wallet, customers have 6 months to pay their bill in full. If they don't, then they are charged interest at a 19.99% APR starting from the original purchase date. Purchases not made through the PayPal wallet will only receive promotional financing if the merchant is offering it. Customers using this service should be aware that using PayPal credit for conveniences such as snacks or food orders which contain alcohol are not allowed to be paid with PayPal Credit and must use a different payment method to complete their transaction.

Developers/new merchant integration
Unlike its parent company PayPal which is available to most e-commerce entities, Bill Me Later isn't  available to most businesses. New merchants can request integration through a website operated by the company.

Services 
Besides its flagship consumer service, Bill Me Later also offers Bill Me Later Business (As of May 13, 2012, Bill Me Later Business has been discontinued) (seen at USPS) and Preferred Account (seen at Newegg). In Bill Me Later Business, the users are business owners who want to use the equivalent of a corporate card for buying products and services over the web. The business owner would apply for Bill Me Later Business - using data like EIN, etc. The Preferred Account is similar to the concept of a charge card  - that can be used at a particular merchant only. PayPal credit card also admits converting gift cards to cash with few conditions.

As of July 2018, there is no available list of online retailers where PayPal credit is accepted. Moreover, PayPal credit is not available as a payment method on all websites where PayPal is accepted.

PayPal wallet 
After the PayPal acquisition of Bill Me Later, Bill Me Later is offered as a payment method through PayPal at sites that both accept PayPal and Bill Me Later. PayPal balances are accepted as payment on Bill Me Later statements.

Lawsuits 
On May 19, 2015 CFPB filed a complaint and proposed consent order in federal court against PayPal, Inc. for illegally signing up consumers for its online credit product, however, a judge has to approve if there was any law infringement before moving the case to court.

External links
PayPal Credit homepage

References

 http://www.consumeraffairs.com/credit_cards/bill_me_later.html?page=2

PayPal
Financial services companies established in 2000
2008 mergers and acquisitions